Sir Louis William Smith (21 March 1879 – 15 March 1939) was a British Conservative Party politician.

After studying at Harrogate College, Smith became an engineer and a company director.  He was elected as Member of Parliament (MP) for Sheffield Hallam at a by-election in July 1928, and held the seat until his death in 1939, aged 59.

References 

 Michael Stenton and Stephen Lees, Who's Who of British MPs: Volume III, 1919-1945

External links 
 

1879 births
1939 deaths
Conservative Party (UK) MPs for English constituencies
Politics of Sheffield
UK MPs 1924–1929
UK MPs 1929–1931
UK MPs 1931–1935
UK MPs 1935–1945